Hapoel Haifa Football Club is an Israeli football club located in Haifa. During the 2019–20 campaign, the club has competed in the Israeli Premier League, State Cup and Toto Cup.

Club

Kits

 Provider: Diadora
 Main Sponsor: Moked Hat'ama
 Secondary Sponsor:  Garden Events

First team

Transfers

Summer

In:

Out:

Winter

In:

Out:

Pre-season and friendlies

Competitions

Overview

Ligat Ha'Al

Results summary

Results by matchday

Regular season

Regular season table

Results overview

Play-off

Championship round table

Results overview

State Cup

Round of 32

Round of 16

Quarter final

Toto Cup

Group stage

11-12th classification match

Statistics

Appearances and goals

|-
|colspan="12"|Players away from Hapoel Haifa on loan:
|-

|-
|colspan="12"|Players who appeared for Hapoel Haifa that left during the season:
|-

|-

|-

|-

|}

Goalscorers

Last updated: 12 May 2019

Assists

Last updated: 12 May 2019

Clean sheets

Updated on 12 May 2019

Disciplinary record

Updated on 12 May 2019

Suspensions

Updated on 12 May 2019

Penalties

Updated on 12 May 2019

Overall

{| class="wikitable" style="text-align: center"
|-
!
!Total
!Home
!Away
!Natural
|-
|align=left| Games played          || 44 || 22 || 22 || 0
|-
|align=left| Games won             || 15 || 8 || 7 || -
|- 
|align=left| Games drawn           || 12 || 5 || 7 || -
|-
|align=left| Games lost             || 17 || 9 || 8 || -
|-
|align=left| Biggest win             || 5 - 1 vs Hapoel Bnei Lod || 4 - 0 vs Hapoel Tel Aviv || 5 - 1 vs Hapoel Bnei Lod || -
|-
|align=left| Biggest loss       || 1 - 4 vs Beitar Jerusalem1 - 4 vs Maccabi Haifa || 1 - 4 vs Beitar Jerusalem1 - 4 vs Maccabi Haifa || 0 - 3 vs Maccabi Tel Aviv0 - 3 vs Maccabi Haifa || -
|-
|align=left| Biggest win (League)    || 4 - 0 vs Hapoel Tel Aviv || 4 - 0 vs Hapoel Tel Aviv || 3 - 0 vs Hapoel Tel Aviv || -
|-
|align=left| Biggest loss (League)   || 1 - 4 vs Beitar Jerusalem1 - 4 vs Maccabi Haifa || 1 - 4 vs Beitar Jerusalem1 - 4 vs Maccabi Haifa || 0 - 3 vs Maccabi Tel Aviv0 - 3 vs Maccabi Haifa || -
|-
|align=left| Biggest win (Cup)    || 5 - 1 vs Hapoel Bnei Lod || 1 - 0 vs Kafr Qasim || 5 - 1 vs Hapoel Bnei Lod || -
|-
|align=left| Biggest loss (Cup)     || 0 - 2 vs Bnei Yehuda Tel Aviv || 0 - 2 vs Bnei Yehuda Tel Aviv || - || -
|-
|align=left| Biggest win (Toto)    || 4 - 1 vs Hapoel Ironi Kiryat Shmona || 4 - 1 vs Hapoel Ironi Kiryat Shmona || - || -
|-
|align=left| Biggest loss (Toto)   || 0 - 2 vs Maccabi Netanya || 1 - 2 vs Hapoel Hadera || 0 - 2 vs Maccabi Netanya || -
|-
|align=left| Goals scored           || 51 || 29 || 22 || -
|-
|align=left| Goals conceded         || 56 || 31 || 25 || -
|-
|align=left| Goal difference        || -5 || -2 || -3 || -
|-
|align=left| Clean sheets            || 15 || 8 || 7 || -
|-
|--
|-
|align=left| Yellow cards          || 104 || 46 || 58 || -
|-
|align=left| Red cards               || 2 || 1 || 1 || -
|-
|align=left| Most appearances      ||colspan=4|  Dor Malul,  Jasmin Burić (42)
|-
|align=left| Most goals        || colspan=4|  Ness Zamir (10)
|-
|align=left| Most Assist        || colspan=4|  Gidi Kanyuk (6)
|-
|align=left| Penalties for   || 9 || 6 || 3 || -
|-
|align=left| Penalties against   || 6 || 3 || 3 || -
|-
|align=left| Winning rate         || % || % || % || -
|-

References

Hapoel Haifa F.C. seasons
Hapoel Haifa